Sidi Rahhal is a town in El Kelaa des Sraghna Province, Marrakesh-Safi, Morocco. According to the 2014 census it had a population of 9906.

References

External links

Populated places in El Kelâat Es-Sraghna Province
Municipalities of Morocco